Telmatocola is a genus of bacteria from the family of Planctomycetaceae with one known species (Telmatocola sphagniphila).
Telmatocola sphagniphila has been isolate from Sphagnum peat from Staroselsky moss from the Tver Region.

References

Bacteria genera
Monotypic bacteria genera
Planctomycetota